Saraswati International School, Valsad is an independent school in Valsad in south Gujarat, India that enrolls students from kindergarten through year 12.  It is named after Saraswati, the Hindu goddess of learning and knowledge. The school is managed by the Saraswati Education Trust, which was established by GM Pandya and led by Mrs. Surekha Saini, The Principal.
It is affiliated to the Central Board of Secondary Education of India.
The school's website is www.sisvalsad.edu.in.

References

External links

 Official site
 Satellite view

International schools in India
Private schools in Gujarat
Valsad
High schools and secondary schools in Gujarat